Cyperus reflexus is a species of sedge that is native to parts of the Americas.

The species was first formally described by the botanist Martin Vahl in 1805.

See also 
 List of Cyperus species

References 

reflexus
Taxa named by Martin Vahl
Plants described in 1805
Flora of Argentina
Flora of Brazil
Flora of Bolivia
Flora of Costa Rica
Flora of Chile
Flora of Ecuador
Flora of Mexico
Flora of Florida
Flora of Louisiana
Flora of Oklahoma
Flora of Texas
Flora of Peru
Flora of Paraguay
Flora of Uruguay
Flora of Venezuela
Flora without expected TNC conservation status